The 1906 Pennsylvania gubernatorial election occurred on November 6, 1906. Incumbent Republican governor Samuel W. Pennypacker was not a candidate for re-election. Republican candidate Edwin Sydney Stuart defeated Democratic candidate Lewis Emery, Jr. to become Governor of Pennsylvania. Louis Arthur Watres, Charles Warren Stone, and William M. Brown unsuccessfully sought the Republican nomination, while Arthur Granville Dewalt unsuccessfully sought the Democratic nomination.

Results

References

1906
Gubernatorial
Pennsylvania
November 1906 events